An 2011 Bloc Québécois leadership election was held on December 11, 2011 to replace Gilles Duceppe, who resigned on May 2, 2011, after the party lost 43 of its 47 seats, including his own seat, in the 2011 federal election. It was won by Daniel Paillé.

Voter turnout for the leadership election was 38%.

Timeline
March 15, 1997: Gilles Duceppe wins the leadership election taking over for Michel Gauthier as party president (leader).
March 25, 2011: Stephen Harper's government is  defeated in a Motion of no confidence losing 156—145 which sets-up the May 2 election.
May 2, 2011: The election is held. The Bloc Québécois won only 4 ridings after having 47 at dissolution of Parliament. The party lost official party status. Gilles Duceppe loses his own riding in Laurier—Sainte-Marie and announces his resignation.
May 3, 2011: Vivian Barbot becomes interim president after failing to regain her riding the night before.
May 11, 2011: Former MP Pierre Paquette announces his interest in running for leader and his intention to tour Quebec this summer to consult party members on the future of the Bloc.
June 2, 2011: Louis Plamondon is named the Bloc's interim parliamentary leader.
June 8, 2011: Party executive sets dates for the leadership election.
August 12, 2011: Paquette tells Le Devoir that he will not be a candidate and urges the party to delay the leadership election for a year.
September 17, 2011: BQ General Council meets to decide the official rules for the leadership election, the council affirmed its decision to hold the leadership election in 2011 rejecting calls to delay the election until 2012;  official start of leadership race.
October 28, 2011: Deadline to submit signatures of 1,000 party members and become an official candidate.
October 31 – November 18, 2011: Advance voting at the BQ's national office during business hours.
November 8, 2011, 6:30 pm: Candidates debate (Quebec City) at Loews Hôtel Le Concorde.
November 11, 2011: Deadline for new members to join the party.
November 15, 2011, 6:30 pm: Candidates debate (Montreal) at Hôtel Delta Montréal.
November 16, 2011: Deadline for membership renewals.
November 22, 2011, 7 pm: Internet candidates debate.
December 10, 2011: Deadline for completed mail-in ballots to be received.
December 11, 2011: Daniel Paillé declared winner after the second ballot.

Candidates

Official candidates

Jean-François Fortin
Background
MP for Haute-Gaspésie—La Mitis—Matane—Matapédia (2011–present)
Former mayor of Sainte-Flavie, Quebec
Only newly elected BQ MP in the current caucus

Date campaign launched:  September 17, 2011
Supporters
Past MPs: (14) Claude Guimond, Rimouski-Neigette—Témiscouata—Les Basques; Paul Crête, Montmagny—L'Islet—Kamouraska—Rivière-du-Loup; Marc Lemay, Abitibi—Témiscamingue; Suzanne Tremblay, Rimouski-Neigette-et-La Mitis; Yvon Lévesque, Abitibi—Baie-James—Nunavik—Eeyou; Robert Bouchard, Chicoutimi—Le Fjord; Yves Lessard, Chambly—Borduas; Ève-Mary Thaï Thi Lac, Saint-Hyacinthe—Bagot; Jean-Yves Laforest, Saint-Maurice—Champlain; Diane Bourgeois, Terrebonne—Blainville; Roger Gaudet, Montcalm; Madeleine Dalphond-Guiral, Laval Centre; Nicole Demers, Laval; Hélène Alarie, Louis-Hébert
Provincial politicians: (6) Danielle Doyer MNA for Matapédia; Marie Bouillé MNA for Iberville; Émilien Pelletier MNA for Saint-Hyacinthe; Irvin Pelletier MNA for Rimouski; Pascal Bérubé MNA for Matane; André Simard MNA for Kamouraska-Témiscouata
Other prominent individuals: (1) Former Portneuf—Jacques-Cartier candidate Richard Côté

Maria Mourani

Background
MP for Ahuntsic (2006–present)
Only BQ MP remaining from the Montreal area
Date campaign launched:  September 21, 2011
Supporters
Past MPs: (7) Christian Ouellet, Brome—Missisquoi; Johanne Deschamps, Laurentides—Labelle; France Bonsant, Compton—Stanstead; Meili Faille, Vaudreuil-Soulanges; Marcel Lussier, Brossard—La Prairie; Osvaldo Nunez, Bourassa; Francine Lalonde, La Pointe-de-l'Île
Other prominent individuals: (4) Jean Campeau, former MNA for Crémazie; former Brome—Missisquoi candidate Christelle Bogosta; comedian François Parenteau; Forum jeunesse du Bloc Québécois, youth wing of the Bloc Québécois
Other information
Mourani has campaigned on making the BQ more independent of the Parti Québécois.

Daniel Paillé

Background
Former MP for Hochelaga (2009–2011)
Former MNA for Prévost (1994–1996)
Former Quebec Minister of Industry (1994–1996)

Date campaign launched:  October 4, 2011
Supporters
MPs: (1) André Bellavance, Richmond—Arthabaska
Past MPs: (16) Claude DeBellefeuille, Beauharnois—Salaberry; Guy André, Berthier—Maskinongé; Roger Pomerleau, Drummond; Richard Nadeau, Gatineau; Pascal-Pierre Paillé, Louis-Hébert; Gérard Asselin, Manicouagan; Nicolas Dufour, Repentigny; Luc Desnoyers, Rivière-des-Mille-Îles; Monique Guay, Rivière-du-Nord; Carole Lavallée, Saint-Bruno—Saint-Hubert; Claude Bachand, Saint-Jean; Robert Vincent, Shefford; Paule Brunelle, Trois-Rivières; Serge Cardin, Sherbrooke; Raynald Blais, Gaspésie—Îles-de-la-Madeleine; Thierry St-Cyr, Jeanne-Le Ber
Provincial politicians: (21) Carole Poirier MNA for Hochelaga-Maisonneuve; Yves-François Blanchet MNA for Drummond; Étienne-Alexis Boucher MNA for Johnson; Noëlla Champagne MNA for Champlain; Alexandre Cloutier MNA for Lac-Saint-Jean; Claude Cousineau MNA for Bertrand; Sylvain Gaudreault MNA for Jonquière; Guy Leclair MNA for Beauharnois; Martin Lemay MNA for Sainte-Marie–Saint-Jacques; Marie Malavoy MNA for Taillon; Agnès Maltais MNA for Taschereau; Nicolas Marceau MNA for Rousseau; Claude Pinard MNA for Saint-Maurice; Scott McKay MNA for L'Assomption; Gilles Robert MNA for Prévost; Sylvain Simard MNA for Richelieu; Mathieu Traversy MNA for Terrebonne; Guillaume Tremblay MNA for Masson; Denis Trottier MNA for Roberval; Dave Turcotte MNA for Saint-Jean; André Villeneuve MNA for Berthier
Other prominent individuals: (9) Former LaSalle—Émard candidate Carl Dubois; former Westmount—Ville-Marie candidate Véronique Roy; former Hull—Aylmer candidate Dino Lemay; former Mégantic—L'Érable candidate Pierre Turcotte, former Honoré-Mercier candidate Martin Laroche; former Outremont candidate Élise Daoust; former Beauport—Limoilou candidate Michel Létourneau; former Roberval—Lac-Saint-Jean candidate Claude Pilote; former Jonquière—Alma candidate Pierre Forest

Declined
Bernard Bigras, former MP for Rosemont—La Petite-Patrie (2004–2011)
Pierre Paquette, former MP for Joliette (2000–2011), after initially expressing interest, announced in August that he will not be a candidate and called for the leadership election to be delayed until late 2012. He indicated that he may re-enter the contest if the leadership vote were delayed.

Results

See also
2011 Canadian federal election
2012 New Democratic Party leadership election
2013 Liberal Party of Canada leadership election
1997 Bloc Québécois leadership election

References

2011
2011 elections in Canada
2011 in Quebec
December 2011 events in Canada
Bloc Québécois leadership election